Daniel Royer House is a historic home located in the community of Royer, Woodbury Township, Blair County, Pennsylvania.  It was built in at least two sections.  The oldest section is a three-bay, two-story stone section built about 1815.  Built about the same time was a -story clapboard section.  A two-bay by five-bay wing addition was probably built in the 1840s.  It features a two-story porch across the length of the addition.  The house is associated with the Royer family; early settlers of Woodbury Township and prominent in the local iron making industry.

It was added to the National Register of Historic Places in 1975.

References

External links

Houses on the National Register of Historic Places in Pennsylvania
Historic American Buildings Survey in Pennsylvania
Houses completed in 1815
Houses in Blair County, Pennsylvania
National Register of Historic Places in Blair County, Pennsylvania